Vincent Marshall (born November 12, 1983) is an American gridiron football coach and former player. He is the wide receivers coach and special teams coordinator at Norfolk State University, a position he has held since 2021. Marshall played professionally as a wide receiver in the Canadian Football League (CLF) with the Saskatchewan Roughriders, Calgary Stampeders, and Winnipeg Blue Bombers. He was signed by the Atlanta Falcons as an undrafted free agent in 2007. Marshall played college football at the University of Houston.

References

External links
 Norfolk State profile
 Southern profile
 Syracuse profile
 Bowling Green football
 Houston profile

1983 births
Living people
American football wide receivers
Canadian football wide receivers
Calgary Stampeders players
Bowling Green Falcons football coaches
Atlanta Falcons players
Houston Cougars football coaches
Houston Cougars football players
Missouri Southern Lions football coaches
Norfolk State Spartans football players
Saskatchewan Roughriders players
Southern Jaguars football coaches
Southwestern Assemblies of God Lions football coaches
Syracuse Orange football coaches
High school football coaches in Texas
People from Ennis, Texas
Coaches of American football from Texas
Players of American football from Texas
African-American coaches of American football
African-American players of American football
African-American players of Canadian football
21st-century African-American sportspeople
20th-century African-American people